Martin Maloney may refer to:
 Martin Maloney (artist), English artist
 Martin Maloney (philanthropist), Philadelphia businessman, philanthropist and papal marquis
 Martin James Maloney, member of the House of Commons of Canada